Tony Duran may refer to:

 Tony Duran (photographer)
 Tony Duran (musician), a guitar player associated with the band Ruben and the Jets